Why Oh Why may refer to:

 "Why Oh Why" (L.A.B. song), a 2020 single by L.A.B.
 "Why Oh Why", a 1997 song by Celine Dion from Let's Talk About Love
 "Why Oh Why", a 2001 song by A Touch of Class from Planet Pop